The Roller Hockey Asian Championship is a roller hockey competition with the national teams of Asian countries that happens every two years. It is organized by CARS, Confederation of Asia Roller Sports.
The last Tournament happening was the 15th Asian Roller hockey Championship in Hefei, China.

Men's results

Tournaments

Medal table

Women's Results

Tournaments

Medal table

References

External links
 13th Asian Roller hockey Championship in Dalian
 FIRS Organizational chart
CIRH website
 India Federation of Roller Sports
 Hong Kong Federation of Roller Sports
 South Korean Federation of Roller Sports
 Japan Roller Sports Federation
 Hóquei Macau
 Roller Hockey links worldwide
 Mundook-World Roller Hockey
Hardballhock-World Roller Hockey
Inforoller World Roller Hockey
 World Roller Hockey Blog
rink-hockey-news - World Roller Hockey
SoloHockey World Roller Hockey
Rink Hockey in the USA
USARS Hardballhockey Blog

Recurring sporting events established in 1987
Roller hockey competitions
Roller hockey in Asia